Shatrovo is the name of several rural localities in Russia:
Shatrovo, Kurgan Oblast, a selo in Shatrovsky Selsoviet of Shatrovsky District of Kurgan Oblast
Shatrovo, Vologda Oblast, a village in Yudinsky Selsoviet of Velikoustyugsky District of Vologda Oblast